The Asterinidae are a large family of sea stars in the order Valvatida.

Description and characteristics 
These are generally small sea stars, flattened dorsally and bearing very short arms, often giving a pentagonal shape in the body ;example: Asterians rubens (except in some species possessing more than five arms). The periphery of the body is thin and formed by indistinct, tiny marginal plates. They are characterized by their aborale face formed by plates shaped like crescents, sometimes giving a "knitted" appearance to the skin.

The abyssal species can be bigger, like those of the genus Anseropoda, which can exceed 45 cm in diameter.

Biology 
Most of the species are small and relatively cryptic: they are often found hidden under rocks or in crevices, for example. Several species have access to a fissiparous asexual reproduction, multiplying their reproductive potential. For that reason, some species of the genera Meridiastra and Aquilonastra can sometimes appear spontaneously in aquariums, where they can proliferate from just one larva imported inadvertently. Some species can brood their young (which thus do not pass through a planctonic larval stage), such as Asterina pancerii.

Most of the species feed on food fragments and algal or bacterial mat covering the substratum, evaginating their stomach on their food (a frequent feeding mode in sea stars). However, some species like Stegnaster inflatus takes advantage of their webbed shape to form a "trap" by heightening on the tip of their arms, and suddenly falling on a prey which would have believed to find shelter there.

They can be found in almost all the seas of the world, from the abysses to the surface and from the poles to the tropics.

Genera
This family comprises about 21 genera and 116 species according to O'Loughlin & Waters (2004), whereas the World Asteroidea Database states that it includes 150 species in 25 genera.

Genera included in the family according to the World Asteroidea Database:
 Ailsastra O'Loughlin & Rowe, 2005
 Allopatiria Verrill, 1913
 Anseropoda Nardo, 1834
 Aquilonastra O'Loughlin in O'Loughlin & Waters, 2004
 Asterina Nardo, 1834
 Asterinides Verrill, 1913
 Asterinopsis Verrill, 1913
 Callopatiria Verrill, 1913
 Cryptasterina Dartnall & al. 2003
 Disasterina Perrier, 1875
 Indianastra O'Loughlin in O'Loughlin & Waters, 2004
 Kampylaster Koehler, 1920
 Manasterina H.L. Clark, 1938
 Meridiastra O'Loughlin, 2002
 Nepanthia Gray, 1840
 Paranepanthia Fisher, 1917
 Parvulastra O'Loughlin in O'Loughlin & Waters, 2004
 Patiria Gray, 1840
 Patiriella Verrill, 1913
 Pseudasterina Aziz & Jangoux, 1985
 Pseudonepanthia A.H. Clark, 1916
 Pseudopatiria O'Loughlin in O'Loughlin & Waters, 2004
 Stegnaster Sladen, 1889
 Tegulaster Livingstone, 1933
 Tremaster Verrill, 1880
 Ctenaster L. Agassiz, 1836
 Desmopatiria Verrill, 1913

References

Bibliography

External links 
 
 
 

 
Echinoderm families
Taxa named by John Edward Gray